Winfred Cooper "Chubby" Adams (born May 25, 1888) was an American politician in Mississippi. He served in the Mississippi House of Representatives from 1924 to 1926 and in the Mississippi Senate, including as President Pro Tempore.

Adams was born in Corinth, Mississippi. He was an officer during World War I. He received a military pension. He studied at Princeton for two years and received a law degree from the University of Mississippi. He married Mary E. Kirk and had four children, one of which, died from the Spanish Flu when she was 4 years old.

His father owned the W. T. Adams Machine Company. It burned in 1918.

References

20th-century American politicians
Mississippi state senators
Members of the Mississippi House of Representatives
People from Corinth, Mississippi
University of Mississippi School of Law alumni
1888 births
Princeton University alumni
United States Army personnel of World War I
Military personnel from Mississippi
Year of death missing